Frank Graham may refer to:

Frank D. Graham (1875–1965), American writer of Audel guides
Frank Porter Graham (1886–1972), Democratic Senator from North Carolina, 1949–1950, and president of the University of North Carolina at Chapel Hill
Frank Dunstone Graham (1890–1949), Canadian-born American professor of economics at Princeton University, co-founder of the Mont Pelerin Society
Frank Graham (writer) (1893–1965), American sportswriter and biographer
Frank Graham (voice actor) (1914–1950), American voice actor and radio announcer
Frank L. Graham, Canadian biologist